Trailblazer was a suspended monorail that operated at Fair Park in Dallas, Texas from 1956 to 1964. It was the first commercially operated monorail system in the United States.

History
Envisioned as a demonstration project for transit solutions, Monorail, Inc. erected a short test system in Houston's Arrowhead Park as the Skyway Line in 1956. During the year, the company contracted with the State Fair of Texas for an expanded project at Fair Park in Dallas. It was completely funded and constructed by Monorail, Inc and operated as a fairgrounds concession by Texas Skyways, Inc — making it the nation's first commercial operating monorail line  Most of the materials (including the vehicle) were repurposed from the Houston test project. It opened with a fare of 25 cents in time for the 1956 State Fair of Texas, and became a top visitor attraction.

It also made an appearance in the 1962 musical film State Fair, which was filmed in Fair Park.

Service and operations
A 51-passenger vehicle—named Trailblazer—was built of light blue fiberglass and powered by two Packard 352 gasoline engines. A two-man crew operated the system with the driver sitting above the passenger compartment atop one of two bogies.

The monorail operated for several years during the State Fair of Texas and year-round on weekends. The system became a showcase of transportation technology for Dallas and Monorail, Inc, attracting the attention of urban planners and city leaders from around the world. 30 months after installation the system had attracted 50,000 riders; by the end of its life it had carried over 1,000,000 people.

In April 1958 a small fire caused the evacuation of Trailblazer, but the six passengers and two crew members escaped unharmed.

The system was closed in 1964 due to diminishing novelty and maintenance, being replaced by the Swiss Sky Ride. The track was dismantled and the vehicle was scheduled to retire to the Goodell Monorail Museum in Houston. Several years later, however, the monorail vehicle was found in a salvage yard. It was later purchased and moved to the town of Wills Point, Texas and converted to a residence, where it remains today.

References

External links
Trailblazer Today
Houston Article and Photos
Photo in Fair Park
Photo of Automobile Building Terminal
Dallas Public Library Images
Video of Trailblazer
"Living in a monorail car"

defunct monorails
monorails in the United States
passenger rail transportation in Texas
railway lines opened in 1956
railway lines closed in 1964
State Fair of Texas
suspended monorails
transportation in the Dallas–Fort Worth metroplex